The Full Frequency Tour is concert tour by Jamaican recording artist, Sean Paul. The tour supports his sixth studio album, Full Frequency (2014). The rapper played over 30 shows primarily in Europe, with additional shows in Asia, North America, Africa and Australasia.

Critical reception
Senior music writer George Palathingal of The Sydney Morning Herald gave the concert in Sydney four stars. He expressed: 
"We have to start with some brutal truth. Early 2000s luminaries Sean Paul and his current touring partner Mýa haven't exactly troubled the mainstream in recent years—certainly not in Australia; minimally, even, in the urban-music-loving US." However he noted, "Nonetheless, on this night, both not only prove to have a sizeable, dedicated following, they still perform as though they're at the peak of their careers."

Speaking on behalf of Mýa’s set, Palathingal wrote, "Mýa is all class. She soulfully sings, dances and, over a couple of costume changes, even dresses like the (ghetto) superstar she only almost became when she was cavorting around in her smalls with Pink, Christina Aguilera and Lil' Kim as the least-impressive name on the 2001 "Lady Marmalade" cover." Writing on behalf of Paul’s performance, he said, "Here, however, the mohawked Paul and his thunderous backing band play an unselfish set loaded with sizzling, pounding takes on the early likes of "Get Busy", "Give It Up to Me", "Like Glue" and "Temperature", rather than constantly force recent material down your throat, and the results are irresistible."

Concluding in his review, "And if there's one lesson we can learn from this night it's that even if we might question his choices on record, live, Sean Paul still definitely knows what he's doing."

The Gleaner gave the concert a positive review as well and wrote, "A scintillating set, complete with full band, DJ, supporting vocals and dancers, Sean Paul electrified the hall for well over an hour and well past curfew. Yet, the audience rocked, danced and screamed as each hit was followed by another hit."

Opening acts
Fii 
Die Boys 
Mýa 
Young Men Society 
Lazy J

Setlist
This setlist was obtained from the concert held on May 10, 2014, at the Rockhal in Esch-sur-Alzette, Luxembourg. It does not represent all concerts for the duration of the tour.
"Want Dem All"
"So Fine"
"Get Busy"
"Give It Up to Me"
"Got 2 Luv U"
"How Deep Is Your Love"
"Hey Baby"
"Baby Boy" / "Break It Off"
"Like Glue"
"Gimme the Light"
"We Be Burnin'"
"Hold On"
"Other Side of Love"
"I'm Still in Love with You"
"Punkie"
"Hold My Hand"
"Body"
"She Doesn't Mind"
"Temperature"
"Turn It Up"

Tour dates

Festivals and other miscellaneous performances
This concert was a part of the "Opening Party"
This concert was a part of "Summer Up"
This concert was a part of the "Wireless Festival"
This concert was a part of the "Reggae Sumfest"
This concert was a part of "Festivent Ville de Lévis"
This concert was a part of "Heitere Open Air"
This concert was a part of "Dreamland"
This concert was a part of "Lokerse Feesten"
This concert was a part of the "Montreal International Reggae Festival"
This concert was a part of "Rototom Sunsplash"

Cancellations and rescheduled shows

References

2014 concert tours